Kim Hye-song (born 2 December 1984) is a North Korean world champion silver medallist boxer. She was born in South Hamgyong Province.

She represented North Korea in the 2012 Summer Olympics taking place in London in the flyweight division. She lost 9–12 in the Round of 16 to Russia's Elena Savelyeva in the first ever women's boxing bout at the Olympics.

 she is ranked 10th in the world.

Achievements 
 2012 – DPR Women's National Championships 1st place – 51 kg
 2011 – Asian Cup Women's Boxing Tournament (Haikou, CHN) 1st place – 54 kg
 2010 – AIBA Women's World Championships (Bridgetown, BAR) 2nd place – 54 kg
 2010 – Asian Women's Boxing Championships (Astana, KAZ) 2nd place – 54 kg
 2010 – North Korean Women's National Championships 1st place – 54 kg

References 

North Korean women boxers
Olympic boxers of North Korea
Boxers at the 2012 Summer Olympics
1984 births
Living people
Boxers at the 2010 Asian Games
AIBA Women's World Boxing Championships medalists
Asian Games competitors for North Korea
Flyweight boxers